The following is a list of female secretaries of state of states and territories in the United States.

Besides those states which do not have separate offices for secretary of state, the states of Idaho, Illinois, Louisiana, Massachusetts, Mississippi, Nebraska, New Hampshire, North Dakota and South Carolina have never had an appointed nor elected female secretary of state.

List of female state secretaries of state

List of female Lieutenant Governors
Certain states do not have a Secretary of State; instead the  Lieutenant Governor is responsible for those duties.

Female territorial secretaries of state

References

State Secretary of State